Dabwali Assembly constituency is one of the 90 constituencies in the Haryana Legislative Assembly of Haryana a north state of India. Dabwali is also part of Sirsa Lok Sabha constituency.

Members of Legislative Assembly

See also

 Dabwali
 Sirsa district
 List of constituencies of Haryana Legislative Assembly

References

Assembly constituencies of Haryana
Sirsa district